Charles-Émile Freppel (1 June 1827 – 12 December 1891), French bishop and politician, was born at Obernai (Alsace).

He was ordained priest in 1849 and for a short time taught history at the seminary of Strasbourg, where he had previously received his clerical training. In 1854, he was appointed professor of theology at the Sorbonne, and became known as a successful preacher. He went to Rome in 1869, at the instance of Pius IX, to assist in the steps preparatory to the promulgation of the dogma of papal infallibility. He was consecrated bishop of Angers in 1870.

During the Franco-German war, Freppel organized a body of priests to minister to the French prisoners in Germany, and penned an eloquent protest to the emperor William I. against the annexation of Alsace-Lorraine. In 1880 he was elected deputy for Brest and continued to represent it until his death. Being the only priest in the Chamber of Deputies since the death of Dupanloup, he became the chief parliamentary champion of the Church, and, though no orator, was a frequent speaker.

On all ecclesiastical affairs Freppel voted with the Royalist and Catholic party, yet on questions in which French colonial prestige was involved, such as the expedition to Tunis, Tong-King, Madagascar (1881, 1883–85), he supported the government of the day. He always remained a staunch Royalist and went so far as to oppose Leo XIII's policy of conciliating the Republic. He died at Angers on 12 December 1891.

Freppel's historical and theological works form 30 vols, the best known of which are:
Les Pères apostoliques et leur époque (1859)
Les Apologistes chrétiens au IIe siècle (2 vols, 1860)
Saint Irénée et l'éloquence chrétienne dans la Gaule pendant les deux premiers siècles (1861)
Tertullien (2 vols, 1863)
Saint Cyprien et l'Eglise d'Afrique (1864)
Clément d'Alexandrie (1865)
Origène (2 vols, 1867)
There are interesting lives by E Cornut (Paris, 1893) and F Charpentier (Angers, 1904).

See also

 Listing of the works of Alexandre Falguière

References

Catholiques entre monarchie et république: monsieur Freppel en son temps; 1792 - 1892 - 1992; actes du colloque national de l'Université Catholique de l'Ouest; Angers 23 - 25 septembre 1992. Publ. sous la responsabilité de Bernard Plongeron. Paris: Letouzey et Ané, 1995. 

1827 births
1891 deaths
People from Obernai
Bishops of Angers
Legitimists
Members of the 2nd Chamber of Deputies of the French Third Republic
Members of the 3rd Chamber of Deputies of the French Third Republic
Members of the 4th Chamber of Deputies of the French Third Republic
Members of the 5th Chamber of Deputies of the French Third Republic
19th-century French Roman Catholic bishops
19th-century French Catholic theologians
Academic staff of the University of Paris
Chevaliers of the Légion d'honneur